Admiral Sir James Michael Burnell-Nugent,  (born 20 November 1949) is a retired Royal Navy officer who served as Commander-in-Chief Fleet from 2005 to 2007.

Early life and education
Burnell-Nugent was educated at Stowe School, then an all-boys private school in Buckinghamshire. He studied mathematics at Corpus Christi College, Cambridge, graduating with a Bachelor of Arts (BA) degree: as per tradition, his BA was later promoted to a Master of Arts (MA Cantab) degree.

Naval career
Burnell-Nugent joined the Royal Navy in 1971.

He was given command of the diesel submarine  in 1978 and of the nuclear-powered submarine  in 1984, carrying out many Cold War patrols. He became Commanding Officer of the frigate  as well as Captain of the 2nd Frigate Squadron in 1992, and in that capacity was involved in the early stages of the Bosnia Crisis. He was in command of the aircraft carrier  and made two joint operational deployments to the Gulf for air operations over Iraq and then conducted further air operations during the Kosovo War. He became Assistant Chief of the Naval Staff in 1999. As Commander United Kingdom Maritime Forces from 2001 to 2002, he was Maritime Commander of the UK Joint Force and the Deputy Maritime Commander of the Coalition for the first 6 months of the War in Afghanistan.

On promotion to vice admiral, Burnell-Nugent took up the post of Second Sea Lord and Commander-in-Chief Naval Home Command in 2003. On 15 November 2005, he was promoted to admiral and took up his position as Commander-in-Chief Fleet. He also held the honorary position of Vice-Admiral of the United Kingdom from 2005 to 2007. Burnell-Nugent stood down from this position in November 2007, and was replaced by Admiral Sir Mark Stanhope. He retired in 2008.

Burnell-Nugent was appointed a Commander of the Order of the British Empire in 1999 and a Knight Commander of the Order of the Bath in 2004.

Later life
Burnell-Nugent served as High Sheriff of Devon for 2015 to 2016. Burnell-Nugent currently runs Orchard Leadership.

Personal life
In 1973, Burnell-Nugent married Mary, a medical doctor and the daughter of the Rt Revd Robin Woods, an Anglican bishop. Together, they have four children: three sons and one daughter.

Burnell-Nugent is an Anglican Christian. He is a churchwarden and a local worship leader.

References

|-

|-

|-

|-

1949 births
Living people
People educated at Stowe School
Alumni of Corpus Christi College, Cambridge
Fellows of Corpus Christi College, Cambridge
Royal Navy admirals
Royal Navy submarine commanders
Knights Commander of the Order of the Bath
Commanders of the Order of the British Empire
High Sheriffs of Devon
English Anglicans